St. John's Day may refer to:

Feasts celebrating the Nativity of Saint John the Baptist:

 January 7, an Eastern Orthodox feast
 June 24, Midsummer Day
an Eastern Orthodox feast celebrating his birth
a Roman Catholic, Lutheran and Anglican feast celebrating his birth
Fête St-Jean-Baptiste
Festival of San Juan
Saint Jonas Day
Jaaniõhtu
Festa Junina
See also Saint John's Eve
 August 29, an Eastern Orthodox feast commemorating his beheading
 September 23
an Eastern Orthodox feast celebrating his conception
a Roman Catholic and Lutheran feast celebrating his conception
 Thout 2, a Coptic Orthodox feast
 Dehwa Daimana (Mandaean feast): 1st day of Hiṭia, the 11th month of the Mandaean calendar

Feasts celebrating John the Evangelist

 December 27, a Roman Catholic, Lutheran, and Anglican feast
 May 8, an Eastern Orthodox feast

See also 

sr:Јовањдан